Kaho Naa... Pyaar Hai is a 2000 Indian Hindi-language romantic action film written, directed and produced by Rakesh Roshan. It marks the debuts of his son Hrithik Roshan (in a double role) and actress Ameesha Patel.

Upon its release on 14 January 2000, the film along with Roshan's debut act and the soundtrack album became an instant sensational blockbuster hit. It earned  worldwide, becoming the highest-grossing film of 2000. It received positive reviews from critics upon release, with particular praise directed towards Hrithik's performance, his dancing skills and looks, and the film's soundtrack. Hrithik became an overnight superstar after . His debut was termed 'Hrithik Mania' by the media, and he has been known as the "Millennial Superstar" ever since.

Kaho Naa.. Pyaar Hai went on to be inducted into the Guinness World Records (2002) for being a feature film with the most awards won—a total of 92 awards received in numerous ceremonies and categories. Likewise, the film would be added to the Limca Book of Records (2003) for the greatest number of awards won by a Bollywood film. As director and producer, Rakesh Roshan collected his first ever Filmfare Award, while his son became the only actor ever to win both the Filmfare Award for Best Actor and the Filmfare Award for Best Debut for the same film.

Following the success of Kaho Naa... Pyaar Hai, the father-son duo have gone on to collaborate in many more films, including Koi... Mil Gaya (2003), Krrish (2006), Kites (2010), Krrish 3 (2013), and Kaabil (2017).

The interval plot twist and a portion of the second half is inspired from the 1986 Kannada film Ratha Sapthami.

Plot 

Rohit and his younger brother Amit are orphans living in Mumbai with their landlords Lily and Anthony (to whom they regard as their aunt and uncle). Rohit is an aspiring singer who works as a salesman in a car showroom, run by Malik. One day, he meets Sonia Saxena, the beautiful daughter of wealthy Mr. Saxena, Malik's friend, when he visits her to deliver the car her father brought for her birthday. Unknown to everyone, Malik is running a drug cartel with the help of two corrupt police officers.

Rohit and Sonia meet again during her birthday party on the beach. After Rohit sings for Sonia, he is invited to perform on a cruise. Rohit and Sonia become drunk during the celebrations and fall into a lifeboat that separates from the ship. Rohit rows to an island, where they are stranded for a couple of days. During this time, they continue to fight and eventually fall in love. They are rescued by Saxena, who does not approve of their love due to their class differences. Rohit is consequently fired from his job by Malik. However, Rohit proves Saxena wrong by saying that if they eloped and married, then it would go against their love. Saxena makes a deal with Rohit claiming that if Rohit becomes successful, Saxena will allow him to marry Sonia because she is from an upper-class family. Determined to prove himself, Rohit and his friends attempt to procure a record deal for him. Rohit eventually becomes a locally well-known artiste and prepares to perform at a concert.

On the day of the show, while going to pick up Amit for it, Rohit witnesses the corrupt policemen and Malik shooting and killing police commissioner, who found out about their drug dealings. They discover Rohit's presence and shoot at him, wounding him before pursuing him over a bridge. Saxena is also revealed to be part of the drug cartel and orders Rohit's murder. They knock his bike off-track, causing him to fall into the Arabian Sea below. Rohit, who doesn't know how to swim, drowns and dies. The policemen are sent to search the in the sea but are unsuccessful in finding his body. Amit is traumatized by the news and becomes mute and Rohit's family and friends, including Sonia, fall into depression.

Saxena sends Sonia to stay with his brother in New Zealand to help overcome her depression. There, she meets her cousin Neeta's friend, Raj Chopra, the son of a billionaire NRI businessman, who, to her immense shock, strikingly resembles Rohit, though their personalities are quite different. Raj falls for Sonia but she avoids him, due to reminding her of Rohit. Upon learning her story, Raj accompanies Sonia back to India and gives her hope to keep living, before deciding to let her go, as he knows she does not love him. However, at the airport, one of the corrupt officers spots them and opens fire on Raj. After Raj and Sonia escape, Raj realizes that somebody is mistaking him for Rohit, and the two realize that Rohit was murdered.

Raj is welcomed by Rohit's family and friends. His presence brings Amit out of his shell, and Raj learns that Amit witnessed Rohit's murder and saw the culprits. The gang decides to set a trap to expose the killers, with Raj posing as Rohit to lure them out while Amit is to identify the guilty men. During this time, Raj confesses to Sonia that he loves her. Malik, Saxena, and the officers panic upon learning that "Rohit" is alive. Raj performs at a concert in tribute to Rohit, knowing his killers will come, although Malik and the officers arrive at the concert disguised. Saxena is reunited with his daughter and learns about the plan. He calls Malik and tells him who "Rohit" really is and not to fire. After the performance, Raj reveals to the crowd details of the shooting that he learned from Amit. Before he can reveal the names of the killers, one of the officers shoots him, causing panic in the audience, although Raj is saved due to wearing a bullet-proof jacket. Saxena tries to chastise Malik, who counterpoints that Saxena is trying to conspire with Sonia to trap them all.

To catch who they believe is Rohit, the officers kidnap Sonia and threaten to kill her if he does not reveal himself. Raj arrives at the place where she is being held. He fights the corrupt police officers and beats each of them to death, saving Sonia. Malik arrives and reveals his motive for mercilessly pursuing Raj and Sonia but is fatally shot by Saxena before he can reveal his involvement. Amit upon arriving with his family recognizes Malik as one of Rohit's killers.

Raj later learns that Saxena was the man Malik called before killing Rohit through Malik's phone. On being confronted, Saxena confesses his crime to his daughter and Raj before being arrested. As Raj is about to leave with Amit, Sonia confesses that she loves him and does not want to lose her love again, as she already lost Rohit. The couple returns to New Zealand, taking everybody with them, and they get married with the blessings of their families.

Cast 
Hrithik Roshan in double roles as 
Rohit Kumar: an aspiring singer from a lower-middle-class background in India; Sonia's lover who dies later
 Raj Chopra: an NRI billionaire businessman and singer residing in New Zealand, later Sonia's husband
Ameesha Patel as Sonia Chopra (née Saxena): Vishal's daughter and Rohit's and Raj's love interest, later Raj's wife
Anupam Kher as Vishal Saxena: the main antagonist, Sonia's father, who orders Rohit's death and then surrenders to the police
Dalip Tahil as Shakti Malik: second main antagonist, Atul's father, Vishal's friend
Mohnish Behl as Inspector Dilip Kadam: a corrupt officer in Vishal's payroll, and one of Rohit's murderers
Ashish Vidyarthi as Inspector Satish Shinde: a corrupt officer in Vishal's payroll, and one of Rohit's murderers
Satish Shah as Anthony Rodriques: Rohit and Amit's landlord; Lily's husband 
Farida Jalal as Lily Rodriques/Aunty: Rohit and Amit's landlady; Anthony's wife 
Rajesh Tandon as Atul Malik: Shakti's son and Sonia's best friend
Asha Patel as Neha Chopra: Raj's mother
Tannaz Irani as Neeta Saxena: Sonia's cousin and Raj's best friend
Vrajesh Hirjee as Tony Bahl: Rohit's best friend
Abhishek Sharma as Amit Kumar: Rohit's younger brother
Johnny Lever as Inspector Parab Sharma
Ram Mohan as Police Commissioner
Payal Malhotra as Shobha Malvade
Dimple Inamdar as Dancer
Jasveer Kaur as Dancer

Production 
The film was launched in 1998 with Hrithik Roshan and Kareena Kapoor in lead roles. However, the latter walked out a few days after the launch, following a "misunderstanding" between the director Rakesh Roshan and Kareena's mother Babita. Rakesh, who had known Ameesha Patel's family for a long time, cast her in the role.

The ship scenes were filmed aboard the Star Flyer. The island scenes were filmed in Krabi, Thailand, in the area near Khao Phing Kan (popularly known as James Bond Island).

Reception

Critical reception 
Kaho Naa.. Pyaar Hai received highly positive reviews from critics upon release, with particular praise directed towards Hrithik's performance and the film's soundtrack. However, most critics also criticized the film's "clichéd" storyline. 

Planet Bollywood'''s Alok Kumar said "I'm telling you all to go see KNPH, a movie with which I had low expectations. The film ended up being very entertaining." Ajay Chaturvedi of Apunkachoice.com said "The film suffers from a bad script." But he praised the performance and dancing of Hrithik saying, "The highlight ... is Hrithik Roshan who has good screen presence, He has acted quite well considering that this is his debut film and he is a brilliant dancer." He praised the music saying "it is a big plus with "Na Tum Jaano Na Hum" and "Ek Pal Ka Jeena" being the pick of the lot."

The reviewer for Filmfare rated it 3.5 out of 5, and wrote, "Rakesh Roshan has come up with a winner. A racy script, excellent product values and taut editing result in a storyline that keeps the audience hooked throughout. The music is also good, especially the title song and numbers such as "Ek Pal Ka Jeena" and "Chand Sitaare". Hrithik is very good in the action and dance sequences, and proves his acting calibre in his very first film. Patel too performs well."

Sabiha Kalolwala of The Indian Express wrote, "Rakesh Roshan has been smart enough to make a film which encompasses all the facets of acting — drama, action, romance, thrill, comedy and tragedy, all of them enacted pretty well by Hrithik Roshan." Of the soundtrack, he wrote, "There is not even one song which is not enjoyable." Anupama Chopra, reviewing the film for India Today wrote, "... Rakesh has taken the routine love-story, added a thriller twist and narrated it with style. KNPH isn't about path-breaking craft, it's about blockbuster presentation. Rakesh's sweat and money are apparent in every frame." She concluded writing, "What doesn't work is the tired villain track. Kher, one of Bollywood's finest, hams from frame 1. Perhaps the idea of playing disgruntled papa yet again was too tedious. His post-climax repenting is almost comical. The rest of the gang isn't much better. The plot is as stale as the performances." Kanchana Suggu of Rediff.com called the film a "great entertainer" and wrote, "One must say Rakesh Roshan knew what he was doing when he cast Hrithik as the lead. The boy is good. The ease and style with which he dances, emotes, fights, makes one forget this is his debut film. He’s had to essay two different characters, and he’s done justice to both." Also commending the performances of other actors, she wrote praises of other departments in that the "music is good, the songs are catchy, the cinematography is appealing, the direction is unobtrusive and the story is actually 'different'."

The interval twist of the movie - where the hero supposedly dies in an accident - and the second half of the film - where the heroine is sent out of her hometown to her uncle's place in order to overcome her depression, but is shell-shocked to find a lookalike in a vehicle nearby, and later catches a glimpse of him again in a discotheque dancing merrily - was reported to be based on the 1986 Kannada movie Ratha Sapthami.

 Box-office 
In India, Kaho Naa... Pyaar Hai was the highest-grossing Bollywood film of 2000. When adjusted for inflation, it was the 11th highest-grossing Bollywood film of all time as of 2011, and the sixth highest-grossing film of the 2000s.

 Soundtrack 

The film's music was composed by Rajesh Roshan with lyrics by Ibrahim Ashk, Saawan Kumar Tak and Vijay Akela. Most of the songs were sung by Lucky Ali, Udit Narayan and Alka Yagnik. The dancing sequences were choreographed by Farah Khan. The songs "Chand Sitare" and most notably, "Dil Ne Dil Ko Pukara" are inspired by the song Voices by Vangelis. The latter song has that tune playing throughout most of the song.

The film's soundtrack album sold about 8.5 to 10million units becoming one of its decades best selling bollywood soundtrack of all time.

 Accolades 

 In popular culture 
The Hindi-language musical romantic film, Na Tum Jaano Na Hum'' (2002) also starring Hrithik alongside Esha Deol and Saif Ali Khan, is named after a song from this film.

See also 

List of highest-grossing Bollywood films

Notes

References

External links 
 
 
 

2000 films
2000s Hindi-language films
Films set in Mumbai
Films shot in New Zealand
Indian romantic thriller films
Films directed by Rakesh Roshan
Films scored by Rajesh Roshan
2000s romantic thriller films
Films distributed by Yash Raj Films
Films shot in Thailand
Hindi remakes of Kannada films